Cemal Tural (1905, Erzincan – 17 December 1981, Istanbul) was a Turkish general. He was the Chief of the General Staff of Turkey and previously Commander of the Turkish Army (1964 - 1966), Commander of the First Army of Turkey (1960 - 1962) and Commander of the Second Army of Turkey (1963 - 1964). He retired on August 16, 1969. He was elected president of the Nation Party in 1973, but shortly thereafter resigned from the post in 1974. He was appointed as Ambassador to South Korea in 1976 and Ambassador to Pakistan in 1981.

Awards and order 
State Medal of Distinguished Service

References 

1905 births
1981 deaths
Turkish Army generals
Commanders of the First Army of Turkey
Commanders of the Turkish Land Forces
Chiefs of the Turkish General Staff
People from Erzincan
Burials at Zincirlikuyu Cemetery
Commanders of the Second Army of Turkey